Anton Giuseppe Barbazza (c. 1720- died after 1771) was an Italian painter and engraver of the Baroque period. He was born in Rome, moved to Bologna, and in 1771 moved to Spain.  In Rome, he had engraved the prints for Francesco Bianchini's L'istoria universale provata coi monumenti, published first in 1697 and reissued in 1747.

References

1720s births
Painters from Rome
18th-century Italian painters
Italian male painters
Italian engravers
Italian Baroque painters
1770s deaths
18th-century Italian male artists